Addin Tyldesley (21 December 1878 – 9 May 1962) was a swimmer who competed in the men's 100 metre freestyle event at the 1908 Summer Olympics.

Information 

Addin was the son of local councilor. His family was famous locally for their swimming exploits and were all members of the of the Tyldesley Swimming and Water Polo Club. He was the first (though not the only) member of his family to compete in the Olympics, where he reached the semi-finals of the men's 100 metre freestyle. Due to his Olympic accomplishments, he became known for being one of the most famous members of the Tyldesley Swimming and Water Polo Club. He later ended up winning swimming titles for the Leicester Swimming Club.

Along with his swimming successes, he played water polo for 18 seasons and served with the Northamptonshire Volunteer Regiment during World War I.

Addin passed away on May 9th, 1965, in Northamptonshire, England. His swimming legacy was later carried on by his relative Duncan Cleworth, who competed in the 1976 Olympics.

References

1878 births
1962 deaths
English male swimmers
Olympic swimmers of Great Britain
Swimmers at the 1908 Summer Olympics
People from Tyldesley
British male freestyle swimmers
Sportspeople from Greater Manchester